The Warren Segraves House is a historic house at 217 Oklahoma Way in Fayetteville, Arkansas.  It is a two-story structure, finished in vertical board siding and brick. Its street-facing east facade has small windows, while the western facade is almost all glass, providing view over the valley to the west. The house was built in 1959 to a design by Arkansas architect Warren Segraves for his family's use, and is a good example of Mid-Century Modern residential architecture. Its most distinctive feature is a series of diamond-shaped panels that give the roof an accordion shape.

The house was listed on the National Register of Historic Places in 2017.

See also
National Register of Historic Places listings in Washington County, Arkansas

References

Houses on the National Register of Historic Places in Arkansas
Houses completed in 1959
Houses in Fayetteville, Arkansas
National Register of Historic Places in Fayetteville, Arkansas